
The following lists events that happened during 1830 in South Africa.

Events
 9 April - The first issue of the Dutch newspaper De Zuid-Afrikaan in the Cape Colony
 Full civil privileges are granted to Roman Catholics in the Cape Colony
 The road over Sir Lowry's Pass is opened

References
See Years in South Africa for list of References

 
South Africa
Years in South Africa